Duke Jing of Jin was according to Sima Qian's Records of the Grand Historian (Shiji) the last ruler of the State of Jin during the early Warring States period of ancient China.  His given name was Jùjiǔ, and he supposedly succeeded his father Duke Xiao of Jin but reigned for only two years before being overthrown by the states of Han, Zhao, and Wei that were founded by former aristocratic clans of Jin.

However, Shiji's account of the last rulers of Jin is often self-contradictory, and is further contradicted by the Bamboo Annals, which does not mention any Jin ruler after Duke Huan of Jin (probably the same person as the Duke Xiao of Shiji).  Historians such as Yang Kuan, Ch'ien Mu, and Han Zhaoqi generally regard the Bamboo Annals as more reliable, since it was unearthed from the tomb of King Xiang (died 296 BC) of the State of Wei, one of the three successor states of Jin.  Duke Huan is therefore generally considered the final ruler of Jin, and the historicity of Duke Jing has been cast in doubt.

References

Monarchs of Jin (Chinese state)
4th-century BC Chinese monarchs